Loving Day is a 2015 novel by Mat Johnson, published by Spiegel & Grau on May 26, 2015.

Johnson described the book as "my coming out as a mulatto" and Baz Dreisinger of The New York Times described Loving Day as "a semi-autobiographical" "extended literary metaphor about race and mixed-race in America."

The novel's title refers to Loving Day, when the U.S. Supreme Court nullified bans on interracial marriage.

Plot
The novel, set in the Germantown section of Philadelphia, is about Warren Duffy, a comic book artist who received a mansion from his deceased father, an Irish-American. Duffy's mother, who was black, had died long ago. Warren had been in a marriage with a Welsh woman and managed a comic book shop in Cardiff, Wales; the marriage ended in divorce and the shop had closed, so Warren is back in Philadelphia.

He reunites with his daughter, Tal, who was conceived after a romance he had in his teenage years. Tal, raised as a White girl, had been in the care of her Jewish grandfather. Warren is unaware of Tal's existence until he meets her during the course of the novel.

Warren enrolls Tal in the Mélange Center, an organization for mixed-race people. He dates Sunita "Sun" Habersham, a comic book aficionado who is a member of the center. As the novel progresses Warren finds his views on race challenged and questioned.

Academic reception
Bucknell University chose it for the first year common reading for the Class of 2020.

References

External links
 Loving Day - Mat Johnson Official Website

Novels set in Philadelphia
2015 American novels
Novels by Mat Johnson
Spiegel & Grau books
Germantown, Philadelphia